The Institute of the Czech Language (ÚJČ) is a scientific institution dedicated to the study of the Czech language. It is one of the institutes of the Academy of Sciences of the Czech Republic. Its headquarters are in Prague and it has a branch in Brno.

The institute was created in 1946, by transformation of the former Office for the Czech Lexicon, founded in 1911 by the former Czech Academy of Sciences and Arts. In 1953 it became a part of the Czechoslovak Academy of Sciences and became a public research institution in 2007.

In the Czech Republic, the institute is widely accepted as the regulatory body of the Czech language. Its recommendations on standard Czech are viewed as binding by the educational system, newspapers and others, although this has no legal basis.

The institute's rich publishing activity has two main branches, firstly scientific monographies, magazines and articles, that could be viewed as conversation between bohemists themselves, discussing matters of the Czech language. Secondly, what could be considered output of these discussions, is a consistent set of rules on vocabulary, grammar and orthography. Of the recommendations published most weight carry those, to which the institute itself assigns "codification status": monolingual dictionaries of the Czech language, Slovník spisovného jazyka českého and Slovník spisovné češtiny pro školu a veřejnost, and the orthography manual Pravidla českého pravopisu. The recommendations published in new editions of these are usually subsequently accepted by a ministry of education to be used in schools. The publication of new editions has often been a source of heated debate and national controversy, as recently as 1993.

The approach of the institute is decidedly prescriptive, in that it leaves uncodified all varieties other than standard, such as common Czech spoken by many Czechs.
There have been unsuccessful attempts to enshrine the position of the Czech language and its minders in legislation, akin to the Language law of Slovakia.

See also 
 List of language regulators

References

External links 
 Institute of the Czech Language of the AS CR – official site
 Slovník spisovného jazyka českého – Institute's online dictionary

Language regulators
1946 establishments in Czechoslovakia
Organizations established in 1946
Czech Academy of Sciences
Czech language